In number theory, the Néron–Tate height (or canonical height) is a quadratic form on the Mordell–Weil group of rational points of an abelian variety defined over a global field.  It is named after André Néron and John Tate.

Definition and properties
Néron defined the Néron–Tate height as a sum of local heights. Although the global Néron–Tate height is quadratic, the constituent local heights are not quite quadratic. Tate (unpublished) defined it globally by observing that the logarithmic height  associated to a symmetric invertible sheaf  on an abelian variety  is “almost quadratic,” and used this to show that the limit

exists, defines a quadratic form on the Mordell–Weil group of rational points, and satisfies

converges and satisfies , but in this case  is a linear function on the Mordell-Weil group. For general invertible sheaves, one writes  as a product of a symmetric sheaf and an anti-symmetric sheaf, and then

is the unique quadratic function satisfying

If the abelian variety  is defined over a number field K and the invertible sheaf is symmetric and ample, then the Néron–Tate height is positive definite in the sense that it vanishes only on torsion elements of the Mordell–Weil group . More generally,  induces a positive definite quadratic form on the real vector space .

On an elliptic curve, the Néron–Severi group is of rank one and has a unique ample generator, so this generator is often used to define the Néron–Tate height, which is denoted  without reference to a particular line bundle. (However, the height that naturally appears in the statement of the Birch and Swinnerton-Dyer conjecture is twice this height.)

The elliptic and abelian regulators
The bilinear form associated to the canonical height  on an elliptic curve E is

The elliptic regulator of E/K is

where P1,…,Pr is a basis for the Mordell–Weil group E(K) modulo torsion  (cf. Gram determinant). The elliptic regulator does not depend on the choice of basis.

More generally, let A/K be an abelian variety, let  B ≅ Pic0(A) be the dual abelian variety to A, and let P be the Poincaré line bundle on A × B. Then the abelian regulator of A/K is defined by choosing a basis Q1,…,Qr for the Mordell–Weil group A(K) modulo torsion and a basis η1,…,ηr for the Mordell–Weil group B(K) modulo torsion and setting

(The definitions of elliptic and abelian regulator are not entirely consistent, since if A is an elliptic curve, then the latter is 2r times the former.)

The elliptic and abelian regulators appear in the Birch–Swinnerton-Dyer conjecture.

Lower bounds for the Néron–Tate height
There are two fundamental conjectures that give lower bounds for the Néron–Tate height. In the first, the field K is fixed and the elliptic curve  E/K  and point P ∈ E(K) vary, while in the second, the elliptic Lehmer conjecture, the curve E/K is fixed while the field of definition of the point P varies.

 (Lang)      for all  and all nontorsion 
 (Lehmer)      for all nontorsion 

In both conjectures, the constants are positive and depend only on the indicated quantities. (A stronger form of Lang's conjecture asserts that  depends only on the degree .) It is known that the abc conjecture implies Lang's conjecture, and that the analogue of Lang's conjecture over one dimensional characteristic 0 function fields  is unconditionally true. The best general result on Lehmer's conjecture is the weaker estimate  due to Masser.

Generalizations
A polarized algebraic dynamical system is a triple  consisting of a (smooth projective) algebraic variety , an endomorphism , and a line bundle  with the property that  for some integer . The associated canonical height is given by the Tate limit

For example, any morphism  of degree  yields a canonical height associated to the line bundle relation .

( is preperiodic if its forward orbit  contains only finitely many distinct points.)

References

General references for the theory of canonical heights
 
 
 
J. H. Silverman, The Arithmetic of Elliptic Curves,

External links
 

Number theory
Algebraic geometry